The "Slave Reparations Act" (also called the Slavery Reparation Tax Credit, Black Tax Credit or Black Inheritance Tax Refund) is a tax fraud related to the concept of reparations for slavery. The scam claims that filers can receive $5,000 or increased social security payouts for African-Americans born in the United States between 1911 and 1926.

It claims that African-Americans are entitled to a $5,000 slavery reparation tax credit. Below is a sample solicitation:

The goal of the scam is to get the victim to send all of their information to the scammer.  By doing this, the scammer will gain the ability to commit identity theft on the victim.

This scam may have resulted from unpassed congressional legislation in 1999 to explore slave reparations. The bill, H.R. 40, would have created a commission to study the possibility of actual reparations to slave families.

Another payout quotes $43,209 as the estimated value of "40 acres and a mule," supposedly laid out in an 1866 bill that was passed by Congress but was vetoed by President Andrew Johnson. No such bill was entered into Congress in 1866. It is based on an actual order by Union General William Tecumseh Sherman, Special Field Order No. 15, that set aside land from Charleston, South Carolina to Jacksonville, Florida for the exclusive use of freed slaves. Each family would receive  from this holding. Sherman may have acted on his own authority. No record exists of President Abraham Lincoln or the War Department authorizing this action.

As President Johnson began to restore property to former Confederates, commissioner Oliver Otis Howard issued Circular 13. The document, put out in July, ordered rapid establishment of forty-acre plots in violation of presidential pardons.

In response to Sherman's precedent and Howard's instructions, the White House issued Howard's Circular 15 in September 1865 ordering restoration of land to pardoned owners and taking them back from freed slaves who had received them under Special Field Order No. 15.

The Southern Homestead Act of 1866 did make public land in some states available to freed slaves. Most of this land was swampy or distant from travel routes or was claimed by lumber companies.

In April 2002, the Internal Revenue Service (IRS) received more than 100,000 attempts to claim reparation tax credits and paid out more than $30 million in erroneous refunds. The IRS continued to report false tax credit scams and claims in 2003 and 2004.

See also
 Affinity fraud

Notes

External links
 IRS article on Frivolous Tax Arguments
 IRS Bulletin about the "Reparations Tax Credit"
 Snopes "Black Tax Credit" debunk

Confidence tricks
Taxation in the United States
Reparations for slavery